Victor is a census-designated place and community in San Joaquin County, California, United States. The population was 215 at the 2020 census, which is lower than 293 at the 2010 census.

The ZIP Code is 95253, and the settlement is inside area code 209.

Geography
According to the United States Census Bureau, the CDP covers an area of 1.3 square miles (3.3 km), all of it land.

Demographics
The 2010 United States Census reported that Victor had a population of 293. The racial makeup of Victor was 177 (60.4%) White, 0 (0.0%) African American, 7 (2.4%) Native American, 19 (6.5%) Asian, 0 (0.0%) Pacific Islander, 79 (27.0%) from other races, and 11 (3.8%) from two or more races. Hispanic or Latino of any race were 150 persons (51.2%).

The Census reported that 293 people (100% of the population) lived in households, 0 (0%) lived in non-institutionalized group quarters, and 0 (0%) were institutionalized.

There were 98 households, out of which 37 (37.8%) had children under the age of 18 living in them, 57 (58.2%) were opposite-sex married couples living together, 12 (12.2%) had a female householder with no husband present, 9 (9.2%) had a male householder with no wife present.  There were 8 (8.2%) unmarried opposite-sex partnerships, and 0 (0%) same-sex married couples or partnerships. 16 households (16.3%) were made up of individuals, and 8 (8.2%) had someone living alone who was 65 years of age or older. The average household size was 2.99.  There were 78 families (79.6% of all households); the average family size was 3.33.

The population was spread out, with 88 people (30.0%) under the age of 18, 22 people (7.5%) aged 18 to 24, 70 people (23.9%) aged 25 to 44, 71 people (24.2%) aged 45 to 64, and 42 people (14.3%) who were 65 years of age or older.  The median age was 32.5 years. For every 100 females, there were 92.8 males.  For every 100 females age 18 and over, there were 107.1 males.

The homeowner vacancy rate was 3.0%; the rental vacancy rate was 10.5%.  149 people (50.9% of the population) lived in owner-occupied housing units and 144 people (49.1%) lived in rental housing units.

Politics
In the state legislature, Victor is in the 5th Senate District, represented by Democratic Cathleen Galgiani, and in the 12th Assembly District, represented by Republican Kristin Olsen.

The town's mayor is local farmer and business owner, Dawson Perry.

References

Census-designated places in San Joaquin County, California
Census-designated places in California